Kalateh-ye Alimardan (also Romanized as Kalāteh-ye ‘Alīmardān; also known as Kalāteh-ye ‘Alī and Kalāteh-ye ‘Alīmardānkhān) is a village in Rezqabad Rural District, in the Central District of Esfarayen County, North Khorasan Province, Iran. At the 2006 census, its population was 158, in 34 families.

References 

Populated places in Esfarayen County